The 1996 Paralympic Games in Atlanta, Georgia, United States, were held from August 16 to 25. It was the first Paralympics to get mass media sponsorship, and had a budget of USD $81 million.

It was the first Paralympic Games where International Sports Federation for Persons with an Intellectual Disability athletes were given full medal status.

Bidding history

In an interview with Atlanta-based Reporters and Newspapers website, the CEO of the Organizing Committee (APOC), the disability rights attorney Andrew Flaming thanked and recognized the efforts of Alana Shepherd, who founded the world-renowned Shepherd Center which was one of the first hospitals in the world dedicated to the rehabilitation of victims of cervical spine accidents. Until March 1992, it was not guaranteed that the 1996 Summer Paralympics would actually be held in Atlanta, as the event was not a part of the original planning did not contain any possibility that the Paralympic Games could be held two weeks after the Olympic Games closing ceremonies. Due to disconnected actions between the two Organizing Committees, even before being secured in Atlanta, the Paralympics began to be promoted and already had their visual identity disclosed and the international promotion had started.

And the concerns came from different areas, either on the part of the Organizing Committee of the Olympic Games (AOCOG) and its disorganization or the and also by the financial aspects that put all areas related to planning and management at risk.Between 1990 and 1992, the Shepherd family observed that there was a lack of interest in hosting the Paralympic Games in Atlanta and this included the neglect not only of local authorities but also of both Olympic sponsors and large international corporations who were headquartered in the city.And this spilled over into the way in which the 1996 Summer Paralympic Games would be financed and promoted, whose actions, if successful, could lead to a massive sale of tickets and licensed products, helping the event itself. Fleming even recalled an interview with Shepard that if Atlanta failed to host the Games, the Great Britain was seen as "the plan B" which was already on the radar of the newly formed International Paralympic Committee (IPC). Fleming also said that the 1ow-budget organizational model used at 1984 Summer Olympics held in Los Angeles was repeated by Atlanta Olympics. As the Californian capital, was the only bidder, they "forget" the 1984 Summer Paralympics.Called as "the last minute games".The games was shared by New York City and Stoke Mandeville in Great Britain and unlike what had happened with its predecessors Seoul who in a late stage signed late cooperation agreements for the realization of the Paralympics after the Olympic Games. He also says that the decision taken by Barcelona to organize "the two events under the same Organizing Committee" caused a lot of discomfort for the American organizers, as the decision taken in early 1987 increased the pressure on them,as was the first time on history that the two events was held as one togheter.In 1990, when Atlanta surprisingly won in a polemic way the rights to host the 1996 Summer Olympics, a group of civil and disability people right led by him and the Shepherd Family matriarch,had a hard iniciative to elaborate and submitting a project to bid for the Paralympics, a project that took a year and a half to complete. Fleming further records when were at the bidding process that the organizers of the Olympic Games were skeptical about hosting the Paralympics one half week after the Olympics and did not want to commit in any way with them. Thus, it would be difficult to achieve the entirety of the planned budget of nearly US$ 80 million, as the Paralympics had no source of funding, nor was there any sale of media rights.

Fleming also recalled that in a previous market survey, only 2% of city locals knew about the Paralympic Games against 4% who knew about the Atlanta Youth Games and the red alert was turned on for the event,as the time was passed. When this situation became public in 1991 it also caused internal tensions in the organization of the Olympics and in order not to damage its image any further, the Atlanta Olympic Organizing Committee donated a sum of money and deciding to help discreetly the organization of the Paralympic Games in some areas. After this awkward situation , the Shepherd Center co-founder Alana Shepherd's made a  courageous cruzade to ensure that the 1996 Summer Paralympics were also held in Atlanta. And after the IPC accept the bid, she made an aggressive strategy to add the involvement of large companies as sponsors and give a larger visibility for the event.

According to press reports at the time, the situation was so drastic that in the first few months, the Organizing Committee of the Paralympics started their works in a adapted small basement place at the Center,as they don't have money to rent commercial rooms. After final documents and proposal were sent to Belgium in late 1990 and some informal agreements were made the following year,the Sheperd Center Committee,had to elaborated their proposal in a 1.5 years time and had to officially presented it during the 1992 Winter Paralympics in Tignes, France.

A different kind of competition
Shortly after the IPC announced that Atlanta's bid proposal had been accepted another race against time has started--this one was seen as the worst, as the bidding committee had to get corporate and large sponsors. Companies like Microsoft, Coca-Cola, CNN and Home Depot were originally committed to buy sponsorship shares, but the United States Olympic Committee (USOC), concerned about all things that might impact on their "Olympic Games" brand,and turned an uncooperative factor about the Paralympic Games. The USOC understood that any move by the United States Paralympic Committee (USPC) could affect the USOC and their stakeholders. The US Department of Justice was sued by the USOC over the USPC Games mascot, the phoenix Blaze. Fleming also said the deal was the trap worked perfectly and required them to approach only corporate sponsors who had already signed an Olympics sponsorship agreement. And after if the one company declined, the Paralympics organizers could only request a competitor with the withdrawing company's permission.As main  example, Fleming said that McDonald's refused to buy a sponsorship quota and act as a partner in a supplier area and the Paralympic catering services,and if any direct competing company wanted to buy it. APOC would have to ask permission for the withdrawing company to sign the contract."would not let them solicit Chick-fil-A, even though Dan Cathy, one of its main executives, had a chair at the organizing committee".Upon realizing she and all of the Paralympic Organizing Committee were being ambushed, Alana Shepherd abruptly terminated all previously signed contracts, taking the risk on this issue and through a press conference and released a list she dubbed the "Sinful Six" as their name were handwritten by her on a piece of paper.This nicknames was gived, because along McDonald's another five Olympic Sponsors did not signed a contract to the Paralympics and blocked eventual negotiations with their direct competitors.On this list were this names:Anheuser-Busch, Visa, Bausch and Lomb, John Hancock Financial and Sara Lee. "I keep the list in my wallet," Shepherd told a reporter at the time. In recent interviews, Shepherd declines to say much about this situation and the deal. "I'm taking the high road now… I'm not digging it up," she said, but added, "They were the losers. We were the winners. "She also attended the 1992 Summer Olympics and the 1992 Summer Paralympics in Barcelona, Spain, and in a stroke of fate happened to have Juan Antonio Samaranch, then president of the International Olympic Committee, sitting next to her and in an informal talking she said. "'You know, it's crazy to have two different committees holding events at the same places,'" she recalled. "They didn't understand it, they were scared of it," she said of Olympics officials' attitude toward the Paralympics. "It was something they didn't understand would help the city become more accessible."

So,against all odds, APOC got more than the US$ 80 milion necessary and aganist all the odds,they successfully held the X Summer Paralympic Games which were held from August 15 to 26, 1996.This event was successfully held one and half week after the closing of the Olympic Games and had some competition venues shared. Contrary to predictions, the event made a impressive profit of millions of dollars, and that amount was used to create BlazeSports America, a Norcross-based non-profit organization that runs sports programs for children and veterans with disabilities.

Atlanta aftermath 

Flaming and Shepherd believed that Samaranch and others must have heard the message. "After Atlanta, the IOC said it would not accept an Olympic bid unless it also made provisions for the Paralympic Games," Fleming said. "The IOC leadership essentially said, 'The Paralympic movement is not going way, especially after Atlanta…'and this was already happening, a few months after the closing of the Atlanta Games, the International Olympic Committee announced that it had changed the rules of the application process and starting from the 2000 Summer Olympics would not accept more than no city would file a bid without disclosing its plans for the Paralympic Games. Following this difficult process, when is bidding for the Olympic Games between 1991 to 1993, the eventual winner the Australian city of Sydney,did not originally guarantee that the city wanted to host the Paralympics.But during the process,they changed their they  attitudes and promised that apart the two events had the possibility to be organized by two different parties, they would give the same treatment to athletes who would be participating in both events and that all Games services would be unified. This also encompassed planing, financing, security, logistics, marketing and ticket sales. This joint planing give the oportunity to share all the functions and made until that Games,"the best ever".
Due to the gigantic amount of these problems, the IOC signed in 1993 a protocol of strategic partnership with the IPC and undertook to include topics related to the Paralympic Games in the questionnaires that would be sent to the cities interested in the 2002 Winter Olympics and the 2004 Summer Olympics.Occasionally,Salt Lake City would be elected to host the 2002 Winter Olympics and the Organizing Committee chose to organize both events under the same umbrella.While of the 11 cities applying for the 2004 Games, 6 had also chosen the joint management model.

Five years later, in 2001, after a change at the Olympic Charter, the International Paralympic Committee became an effective collaborator of the International Olympic Committee, and its president became a compulsory member of the IOC. With that, a cooperation agreement was signed informally called "One city, two events" and from then on, the same city and the same Organizing Committee would be responsible for the Olympic Games and the Paralympic Games of the same year, and this concept started to be used during the process that led Beijing to win the process to host the 2008 Summer Olympics.

Incidents during the Games 
In addition to problems related to organization and funding between the two Committees. Other difficulties and problems were recorded when the Paralympic athletes arrived at the Olympic Village. They made public the displeasure of the first delegations that registered with the Olympic Village about the state of conservation of its rooms, the availability of food and especially the conditions of logistics between the village and the venues because of the distances and accessibility of the same. These were not the first problems that were reported in the so-called "transition period" that lasted from August 5th to 16th. Several media, that were covering the games, made public accusations about the fact that the Olympic Games Organizing Committee was showing negligence about the Village services and raised serious possibilities that the situation was a result of numerous contractual failures between the two parties. This agreement also included the infrastructures issues of those sites that were shared and their cleaning and conservation, until APOC could take over their operation. At the exact moment athletes were able to access their accommodations, the athletes and participating delegations also noticed that several electronic devices and sockets were summarily ripped off and there was furniture missing, which turned the residential part of the village into a mess. The amount of criticism was so great that ACOG issued a public denial about the situation, claiming that some delegations arrived two days earlier than planned in Atlanta. As had already happened at the Olympics, logistics and accessibility were serious problems, as competitions were held in 17 venues scattered throughout Metro Atlanta, with only 3 being close to the Village and another 6 exclusive venues for the Paralympics inside member institutions of the Georgia University System that served as training facilities during the Olympic Games, as the only originally signed contract was about to share some competition venues. Another situation that caused many embarrassments was the way APOC dealt with athletes with intellectual disabilities. As this was the first time in the history of the Summer Paralympics that athletes with this type of disability were included in the sports program. As the decision to include them was made late (in 1995), there was no mention of them in official publicity and promotion materials for the Games. Not even they were officially mentioned during the opening ceremony nor during their competitions held in the early days. Even with official complaints, made insistently and repeatedly made by Bernard Athos, then president of the International Association of Sports for People with Intellectual Disabilities (INAS-FHM), were heard by APOC. Their complaints were going unnoticed until they reached the ears of journalists covering the Games and were made public. This situation was only resolved when it was publicly disclosed by local and international newspapers. Soon after, the APOC announced through a press release that the situation had been unintentionally caused.

Look of the Games 
The visual concept for this edition was called "The Ascending Flame" and was based at the logo called "StarFire" released in 1992 and was developed by the local design office Copeland Design who had created all the visual concepts for the city's bid for the Olympic Games. The office took advantage of its already being public knowledge that the two events would be held separately. A totally different corporate identity was created. It was from common sense that this would be the biggest edition of the Paralympic Games so far in everything, and that echoed in the logo which is similar to the logo of the Olympic Games bid. The chosen graphic should be connected with the constant expansion and recent recognition of the Paralympic Movement around the world. And also had to be remembered with the fact that the Paralympics "was ceasing to be a second class event and now they are enter into a mainstream visibility". The highest feature at the concept of "The Ascending Flame" is a special feature of the city as one of main logistics hubs in the world due their strategic location between the south and southeast of the United States. This prominence was enhanced when the Hartsfield-Jackson Atlanta International Airport has become one of the main airports in the world and led to the city's first period of rapid development. Another recurring idea was that this issue could serve as the "light of inspiration" for the issue of basic rights for people with disabilities around the world in a parallel with what Martin Luther King Jr. did with the civil rights movement.

According to a survey carried out by the Atlanta History Center, there are few recorded materials about the development of this project. However, Copeland Design was also responsible for creating the visual identity. In these documents, the so-called concept of "The Ascendent Flame" is explained and associated with the Games slogan that was "The Triumph of the Human Spirit" along the mascot that was the phoenix Blaze.

Mascot

The mascot for the Paralympic Summer Games in Atlanta 1996 was Blaze. Blaze was created by Trevor Stone Irvin of Irvin Productions in Atlanta.

Blaze is a phoenix, a mythical bird that rises from ashes to experience a renewed life. The phoenix appears in Greco-Roman, Egyptian, Arabian, Chinese, Russian and Native American folklore and in all instances symbolizes strength, vision, inspiration and survival.
The phoenix was an ideal mascot for the 1996 Atlanta Paralympic Games and later for BlazeSports America, a nonprofit organization that is the direct legacy of the Games. The phoenix has long been the symbol of Atlanta's rebirth after its devastation in the American Civil War. But most importantly, it is the personification of the will, perseverance and determination of youth and adults with physical disability to achieve full and productive lives.
Blaze, with his bright colors, height and broad wing span, reflects the traits, identified in a focus group of athletes with disability, as those they believed best represented the drive to succeed of persons with physical disability who pursue sports as recreation and as a competitive endeavor.
Today, Blaze is the most recognizable symbol of disability sport in America.

Sports 

The games consisted of 508 events spread over twenty sports, including three demonstration sports.
 Archery
 Athletics
 Boccia
 Cycling
 Equestrian
 Football 7-a-side
 Goalball
 Judo
 Lawn bowls
 Powerlifting
 Racquetball
 Sailing (demonstration sport, but medals awarded)
 Shooting
 Swimming
 Table tennis
 Volleyball
 Wheelchair basketball
 Wheelchair fencing
 Wheelchair rugby (demonstration sport, but medals awarded)
 Wheelchair tennis

Venues 
In total 17 venues were used at the 1996 Summer Olympics and five new venues were used at the Games in Atlanta.

Olympic Ring 
 Centennial Olympic Stadium – opening/closing ceremonies, athletics
 Alexander Memorial Coliseum – standing volleyball
 Georgia Tech Aquatic Center – swimming

Metro Atlanta 
 Henderson Arena – judo and wheelchair rugby
 Panther Stadium – lawn bowls and 7-side-football
 Woodruff P.E. Center – boccia
 GSU Sports Arena – goalball
 Marriott Marquis – powerlifting
 Sheffield Building – wheelchair fencing
 Forbes Arena and Omni Coliseum – wheelchair basketball
 Clayton State Arena – sitting volleyball
 Wolf Creek Shooting Complex – shooting
 Stone Mountain Park – archery, wheelchair tennis and cycling

Duluth 
 Gwinnett Center – table tennis

Another Venues 
 Lake Lanier – yachting
 Georgia International Horse Park – equestrian

Calendar
In the following calendar for the 1996 Summer Paralympics, each blue box represents an event competition. The yellow boxes represent days during which medal-awarding finals for a sport are held. The number in each yellow box represents the number of finals that are contested on that day.

Medal count 

A total of 1574 medals were awarded during the Atlanta games: 517 gold, 516 silver, and 541 bronze. The host country, the United States, topped the medal count with more gold medals, more bronze medals, and more medals overall than any other nation. Germany took the most silver medals, with 58.

In the table below, the ranking sorts by the number of gold medals earned by the top ten nations (in this context a nation is an entity represented by a National Paralympic Committee). The number of silver medals is taken into consideration next and then the number of bronze medals.

Participating delegations 
A total of 104 National Paralympic Committees were represented at the 1996 Games, and the combined total of athletes was about 3,260.Countries who made their first appearances in the Atlanta Games were : Afghanistan, Angola, Armenia, Azerbaijan, Bermuda, Bosnia and Herzegovina, Former Yugoslavian Republic of Macedonia, Honduras, Kyrgyzstan, Libya, Mauritius, Moldova, Qatar, Saudi Arabia, Sierra Leone, Ukraine and Zambia.

Gallery

See also 

 1996 Summer Olympics
 BlazeSports America, the legacy organization of the 1996 Paralympic Games

References

External links 
 International Paralympic Committee
 

 
Paralympics
Sports competitions in Atlanta
Paralympics
Paralympics
1996 in sports in Georgia (U.S. state)
1996 in Atlanta
Multi-sport events in the United States
Paralympic Games
Summer Paralympic Games
Summer Paralympics